Elections to Stirling Council were held on 3 May 2012, the same day as the 31 other local authorities in Scotland. The election used the seven wards created under the Local Governance (Scotland) Act 2004, with 22 councillors being elected. Each ward will elect either 3 or 4 members, using the STV electoral system.

The election saw the Scottish National Party increase their representation by 2 seats and significantly increase their vote share to become the largest party on the council. The Scottish Labour Party and the Scottish Conservative and Unionist Party retained their 8 and 4 seats respectively while the Scottish Green Party gained a seat on the authority. By contrast the Scottish Liberal Democrats were wiped out losing all their 3 seats.
 
Following the election a coalition was formed between the Labour Party and the Conservatives which replaced the previous SNP minority administration.

Election result

Note: "Votes" are the first preference votes. The net gain/loss and percentage changes relate to the result of the previous Scottish local elections on 3 May 2007. This may differ from other published sources showing gain/loss relative to seats held at dissolution of Scotland's councils.

Ward results

Trossachs and Teith
2007: 1xSNP; 1xCon; 1xLab
2012: 2xSNP; 1xCon
2007-2012 Change: SNP gain from Lab

Forth and Endrick
2007: 1xLab; 1xSNP; 1xCon
2012: 2xSNP; 1xCon
2007-2012 Change: SNP gain one seat from Lab

Dunblane and Bridge of Allan
2007: 1xSNP; 1xCon; 1xLab; 1xLib Dem 
2012: 1xSNP; 1xCon; 1xLab; 1xGRN
2007-2012 Change: GRN gain one seat from Lib Dem

Castle
2007: 1xSNP; 1xLab; 1xLib Dem
2012: 2xLab; 1xSNP
2007-2012 Change: Lab gain one seat from Lib Dem

Stirling West
2007: 1xSNP; 1xLab; 1xCon
2012: 1xLab; 1xSNP; 1xCon
2007-2012 Change: No change

Stirling East
2007: 1xSNP; 1xLab; 1xLib Dem
2012: 2xLab; 1xSNP
2007-2012: Change: Lab gain one seat from Lib Dem

Bannockburn
2007: 2xLab; 1xSNP
2012: 2xLab; 1xSNP
2007-2012 Change: No change

Post-Election Changes
†On 7 May 2015, Stirling East SNP Cllr Steven Paterson was elected as the MP for Stirling. He resigned his Council seat on 30 June 2015. A by-election was held on 1 October 2015 to fill the vacancy and the seat was held by the SNP's Gerry McLaughlan.

By-Elections since 2012

References

External links
 Official website

2012
2012 Scottish local elections